The Pitfall is a 1989 Swedish drama film directed by Vilgot Sjöman. It was entered into the main competition at the 46th Venice International Film Festival.

Cast 

Börje Ahlstedt - Larry Pedersen 
Maria Kulle - Pix 
Ewa Fröling - Maud 
Kajsa Reingardt - Elisabeth 
 - Mattias 
Halvar Björk - Westin 
Emy Storm - Larry's Secretary

References

External links

1989 films
Swedish drama films
1989 drama films
Films directed by Vilgot Sjöman
1980s Swedish films